TOI-628 b is an exoplanet whose mass is 6.33 times that of Jupiter. It has an orbital period of 3.4 days and was discovered by TESS in January 2021. It is located 583 light years away from Earth.

References 

Exoplanets discovered in 2021
Exoplanets discovered by TESS